Louis Späth (fl. 1892) appears in the International Plant Names Index as the author of one or more botanical names.  His specialism was spermatophytes.

References

19th-century botanists